The Vybrid Series is a low power System on chip from Freescale Semiconductor with ARM Cortex-A5 and optional Cortex-M4 cores. The full featured VF6xx comes with asymmetrical multiprocessing using both cores.  Lower cost alternative such as the VF5xx and VF3xx only support the ARM Cortex-A5.  The ARM Cortex-A5 cores run from 266 MHz to 500 MHz depending on package options and ARM Cortex-M4 Cores at 168 MHz if present.

References

External links
 Freescale processors roadmap by series on EASA

Freescale Semiconductor
NXP Semiconductors